Methoxypyrazines are a class of chemical compounds that produce odors.  The odors tend to be undesirable, as in the case of certain wines, or as defensive chemicals used by insects such as Harmonia axyridis which produces isopropyl methoxy pyrazine (IPMP).  They have also been identified as additives in cigarette manufacture. Detection thresholds are very low, typically near 2 parts per trillion (1 ng/L).

Examples of methoxypyrazines in wine grapes 
Cabernet Sauvignon has high levels of methoxypyrazines.  Two methoxypyrazine compounds, 3-isobutyl-2-methoxypyrazine (IBMP) and 3-isopropyl-2-methoxypyrazine (IPMP), are  considered to be important determinants of green flavours in Sauvignon blanc wines.

See also 
 Alkylpyrazines

References 

Pyrazines
Ethers
Wine chemistry